Navarredonda de la Rinconada, part of the autonomous community of Castile-Leon, is a village and municipality in the western province of Salamanca in Spain.

Geography

See also
List of municipalities in Salamanca

References

Municipalities in the Province of Salamanca